Marcus Antonius Primus (born between 20 AD and 35 AD – died after 81 AD) was a senator and general of the Roman Empire.

Biography

Early life
Primus was born at Tolosa (Toulouse) in Gaul. He was likely the son/grandson of Lucius Antonius (grandson of Mark Antony). Another possibility is that he was descended from Gauls who had been enfranchised by Mark Antony during his Gallic campaign. He was nicknamed Beccus ("Beaky"), likely due to his physique.

Career
During the reign of Nero, he was resident in Rome and a member of the Senate, from which he was expelled for conspiring to forge a will with Valerius Fabianus, and was banished from the city. He was subsequently reinstated by Galba, and placed in command of the Legio VII Galbiana in Pannonia.

During the civil war, Primus was one of Vespasian's strongest supporters. Advancing into Italy, he gained a decisive victory over the Vitellians at Bedriacum in October 69, and on the same day stormed and captured Cremona. His victorious troops then sacked and burned the city. Embarrassed by the incident he forbade enslavement of captive Cremonans, and their captors then began murdering those who could not be ransomed. He then crossed the Apennines, and made his way to Rome, into which he forced an entrance after considerable opposition. Vitellius was seized and put to death. For a few days, Primus was virtually ruler of Rome, and the Senate bestowed upon him the rank and insignia of a consul, but on the arrival of Licinius Mucianus, he left Rome.

Primus must have been alive during the reign of Domitian, since four epigrams of Martial are addressed to him. Tacitus describes him as brave in action, ready of speech, clever at bringing others into odium, powerful in times of civil war and rebellion, greedy, extravagant, in peace a bad citizen, in war an ally not to be despised.

References

Citations 

1st-century Romans
Ancient Roman generals
30s births
Year of death unknown
Primus, Marcus
Generals of Vespasian